Harry Jon Benjamin (born May 23, 1966) is an American actor, comedian, writer, producer and musician. Benjamin is known for his voice roles in adult animated series, including Sterling Archer in Archer, Bob Belcher in Bob's Burgers, Carl in Family Guy, Ben in Dr. Katz, Professional Therapist, Kevin in O'Grady, Satan in Lucy, the Daughter of the Devil and Coach McGuirk and Jason Penopolis in Home Movies. Benjamin was named 2014's male comedy performer of the year at Vulture's TV Awards for his work in Bob's Burgers and Archer. He also performs in the 2001 satirical comedy film, Wet Hot American Summer, its subsequent 2015 television series, Wet Hot American Summer: First Day of Camp and the final installment of the franchise, the 2017 mini series, Wet Hot American Summer: 10 Years Later.

Early life
Benjamin was born on May 23, 1966, to a Jewish family in Worcester, Massachusetts. His father, Howard, was CEO of an electric company, and his mother, Shirley, was a former ballet dancer who taught dance at a studio. He graduated from Worcester Academy in 1984 and Connecticut College in 1988.

Career
Benjamin's comedy career began in Boston, where he was in a comedy duo with Sam Seder, then a member of Cross Comedy, a comedy team led by David Cross. For the first seven years of his career, Benjamin almost exclusively worked in groups rather than independently. Afterward, his independent work remained more experimental, rejecting traditional styles of stand-up comedy.

Benjamin's live projects include the Midnight Pajama Jam, a show performed in New York City with Jon Glaser and Tinkle, a show combining stand-up comedy and live music, co-hosted by Todd Barry and David Cross. A Midnight Pajama Jam DVD is currently in production. Benjamin and Cross appear together on the album Invite Them Up.

He was the guest on Space Ghost Coast to Coast in its eighty-first episode, "King Dead" on December 17, 1999, where Zorak and Moltar kidnapped him. He has appeared in the television show Cheap Seats, on ESPN Classic, as "Gene Stapleton" and "Rabbi Marc Shalowitz". He co-starred in Todd Barry's short film Borrowing Saffron and portrayed a talking can of vegetables with a shameful habit of autofellatio in the film Wet Hot American Summer.  He made short cameos in Not Another Teen Movie as the football trainer and on the FX Network comedy drama Rescue Me as the pimp "F-bomb" in season two. He can be seen in Turbocharge-the Unauthorized Story of the Cars, a comedy biopic about the '80s rock band The Cars, playing the role of Cars' manager Elliot Roberts in his usual deadpan comedic delivery.

Benjamin has done extensive voice work in animated TV shows. His credits include starring roles in several Soup2Nuts cartoon shows, such as Science Court, Home Movies, O'Grady, Dr. Katz, Professional Therapist and Assy McGee. He co-created Freak Show with David Cross. Benjamin starred as the Devil and multiple other roles in Lucy, the Daughter of the Devil, which ran for one season on Adult Swim beginning September 9, 2007. Benjamin plays a recurring character on the PBS Kids series WordGirl and is the announcer for The Sam Seder Show and The Majority Report. He did the voice of "Shelly," Sam Seder's accountant, on Breakroom Live with Maron & Seder.

Benjamin has made guest appearances in several animated shows. He was in the Aqua Teen Hunger Force episodes "Bus of the Undead" and "The Last One" as Mothmonsterman, in "Broodwich" as Mr. Sticks, in "Bible Fruit" as Mortimer Mango and played the live-action role of Master Shake in "Last Last One Forever and Ever," credited as Capt. Turd Mahoy. He made a cameo appearance as a government agent in the film Aqua Teen Hunger Force Colon Movie Film for Theaters alongside frequent collaborator Jon Glaser. He has appeared in Family Guy as Carl, a movie trivia obsessed convenience store clerk who portrayed Yoda in the Star Wars parody episode "Something, Something, Something, Dark Side."

Other appearances include The Venture Bros., in the episodes "Escape to the House of Mummies Part II," "I Know Why the Caged Bird Kills" and "The Better Man," in which he played Dr. Orpheus's master—who appears in the form of Cerberus, Catherine the Great's horse and, in "The Better Man," both Dr. Orpheus's ex-wife and a future Dean Venture, respectively. He appeared in the Stella short "Bar," which can be found as an easter egg on the Season 1 DVD. Benjamin appeared on the Comedy Central sketch/variety show Important Things with Demetri Martin.

In 2009, Benjamin and David Cross created and wrote for Paid Programming, a live-action pilot for Cartoon Network's late night programing block, Adult Swim. Paid Programming was not picked up for a full series and Benjamin referred to it as an "abject failure".

Benjamin was featured in a Super Bowl XLIII Bud Light commercial with Conan O'Brien and was responsible for the McCain Girls videos on YouTube. He voices Sterling Archer, a secret agent in the FX series Archer that first aired January 14, 2010. He has appeared in several segments of the television show Human Giant and had a cameo in the American Dad! episode "License to Till" as a talking head of cabbage.

Benjamin starred in the Comedy Central series Jon Benjamin Has a Van, which he co-created with comedian Leo Allen. The series debuted on May 14, 2011; a total of 10 episodes aired, the last on August 10, 2011.

Beginning in 2013, Benjamin's voice can be heard as the narrator of a series of TV commercials for Coke Zero, including some with tie-ins to ESPN's College Game Day program.

In 2014, Benjamin was named as the year's best male comedy performer for his work on Bob's Burgers and Archer by the Vulture TV Awards, a digital expansion of New York magazine.

In 2015, despite not knowing how to play any instrument, Benjamin released his first jazz album, Well, I Should Have.... Benjamin "played" piano and was joined by Scott Kreitzer on sax, David Finck on bass and Jonathan Preitz on drums.

Benjamin wrote a comedic autobiography Failure is an Option: An Attempted Memoir, which was published by Penguin Random House in May 2018. He also narrated the audiobook.

Benjamin began appearing in commercials for Arby's restaurant chain in 2018 as their new spokesman.

In March 2020, Benjamin was the voice of Saddam Hussein in Blowback, a podcast about the Iraq War created and hosted by Brendan James and Noah Kulwin.

Personal life
Benjamin was named "Harry" after his paternal grandfather, but his family has always called him by his middle name "Jon"; in his early years, he was unaware of his actual first name. He has said that the inclusion of his first initial in the credits on Dr. Katz, Professional Therapist was done without his consent by co-star Laura Silverman "just to make fun of me."

Benjamin's longtime partner is set decorator Amy Beth Silver. They have a son, Judah, and live in Brooklyn.

Benjamin is an amateur ornithologist.

In January 2020, Benjamin endorsed Bernie Sanders for president and narrated a series of videos on Sanders's health care proposals. In September 2020, Benjamin voiced an animated version of himself to promote the launch video for the Gravel Institute's YouTube channel.

Filmography

Film

Television

Video games

References
Notes

External links

 

1966 births
20th-century American comedians
20th-century American male actors
21st-century American comedians
21st-century American male actors
American male film actors
American male television actors
American male television writers
American male voice actors
American stand-up comedians
Television producers from Massachusetts
American television writers
Annie Award winners
Comedians from Massachusetts
Connecticut College alumni
Jewish American male actors
Jewish American male comedians
Living people
Male actors from Worcester, Massachusetts
Screenwriters from Massachusetts
Writers from Worcester, Massachusetts
21st-century American Jews